Caspofungin (INN) (brand name Cancidas) is a lipopeptide antifungal drug from Merck & Co., Inc. discovered by James Balkovec, Regina Black and Frances A. Bouffard.  It is a member of a new class of antifungals termed the echinocandins. It works by inhibiting the enzyme (1→3)-β-D-glucan synthase and thereby disturbing the integrity of the fungal cell wall. Caspofungin was the first inhibitor of fungal (1→3)-β-D-glucan synthesis to be approved by the United States Food and Drug Administration.
Caspofungin is administered intravenously.

It is on the World Health Organization's List of Essential Medicines.

Spectrum of Activity
Caspofungin has been effective in treating fungal infections caused by Aspergillus and Candida species. It is a member of the echinocandin family, a new class of antifungal agents with broad spectrum of activity against all Candida species. In comparison to treatment with either fluconazole or Amphotericin B, all three drugs in this class have been demonstrated to be highly effective or superior in well-defined clinical settings including invasive Candida infections, Candida oesophagitis and candidaemia. Higher minimum inhibitory concentration (MIC) of these agents has been observed against C. parapsilosis and C. guilliermondii.

The following summarizes MIC susceptibility for a few medically significant organisms.
 Candida albicans 0.015 — 16 μg/mL
 Candida krusei 0.03  — 8 μg/mL
 Cryptococcus neoformans — 16 μg/mL

Indications
Caspofungin acetate for injection was originally approved by both the Food and Drug Administration (FDA), in the U.S., and the EMEA, in Europe, in 2001.

Its currently approved therapeutic indications by both organisations include the empirical therapy of presumed fungal infections in febrile, neutropenic adult patients and for salvage therapy in patients treatment of invasive aspergillosis in adult patients whose disease is refractory to, or who are intolerant of, other antifungal agents (i.e., conventional or lipid formulations of amphotericin B and/or itraconazole). Additionally, the FDA approval includes indication for the treatment of candidemia and some specific Candida infections (intra-abdominal abscesses, peritonitis, pleural cavity infections, and esophagitis) and the EMEA approval includes indication for the treatment of general invasive candidiasis in adult patients.

Metabolism
Slowly metabolized by peptide hydrolysis and N-acetylation in liver. Therefore, in case of liver impairment the dose needs to be reduced. Caspofungin also undergoes spontaneous chemical degradation to an open-ring peptide compound, L-747969. Additional metabolism involves hydrolysis into constitutive amino acids and their derivatives, including dihydroxyhomotyrosine and N-acetyl-dihydroxyhomotyrosine.

Clinical efficacy
About 36% of patients refractory to other therapies responded well to caspofungin therapy, while even 70% of patients intolerant to other therapies were classified as responders. Direct comparative studies to other drugs in the treatment of invasive aspergillosis have so far not been undertaken.

Contraindications
Known hypersensitivity to caspofungin acetate or any other ingredient contained in the formulation contraindicate its use.

Warnings
 Hepatic effects

The concomitant use of caspofungin and cyclosporine in healthy volunteers led to a more frequent increase of liver enzymes (ALT=SGPT and AST=SGOT) than noted with cyclosporine alone. Combination treatment is only indicated if the potential benefit for the patient outweighs the potential risk.

Dosage reduction in patients with moderately impaired liver function is recommended. No clinical data exist regarding the use of caspofungin in patients with severely impaired liver function.
 Sensitivity reactions
Reactions due to histamine release (rash, facial swelling, pruritus, sensation of warmth and one case of anaphylaxis) have been seen. Health-care providers should carefully watch for these reactions.
 Drug resistance
In a few patients with infections caused by Candida albicans, mutants with reduced sensitivity to caspofungin have been noticed. Currently there are no data regarding development of resistance in other fungi than C. albicans.

Pregnancy and lactation
Caspofungin has been shown in animal studies to have embryotoxic properties, and therefore has been assigned to class C. It should only be given to pregnant women if the benefit to the mother clearly outweighs the potential risk to her fetus.

The drug is found in the milk of lactating rats, but it is not known whether this is seen in humans. Thus, lactating women should be treated cautiously.

Geriatric patients
Ordinarily, no dose adjustments are necessary, however, greater sensitivity of some older individuals cannot be ruled out.

Pediatric patients
Caspofungin is FDA approved for pediatric patients 3 months and older. Dosing is based on body surface area (BSA) as calculated by the Mosteller formula.

Side effects
Compared to amphotericin B, caspofungin seems to have a relatively low incidence of side effects. In clinical studies and postmarketing reports, the side effects seen in 1% or more of the patients were as follows:
 Gastrointestinal system: nausea, vomiting, abdominal pain, and diarrhea
 Central nervous system: headache
 Whole body: fever, phlebitis or thrombophlebitis, complications at the intravenous cannulation site (e.g. induration), unspecified pain, flu-like syndrome, myalgia, chills, and paresthesia
 Respiratory: dyspnea
 Renal: increased plasma creatinine
 Hematological: anemia
 Electrolytes: hypokalemia
 Liver: increased liver enzymes (asymptomatic)
 Hypersensitivity: rash, facial edema, pruritus
 Other: tachycardia

Additionally, infrequent cases of symptomatic liver damage, peripheral edema and swelling, and hypercalcemia have been seen. One case of anaphylaxis (severe allergic reaction) has also been noted.

Resistance
Resistance in C. albicans has been described, but is currently still rare. The mechanism is probably a point mutation in the (1→3)-β-D-glucan synthase gene.

Drug interactions
 Cyclosporin: see under hepatic effects
 Tacrolimus: potential pharmacokinetic interactions
 Other systemic antimycotic agents: with amphotericin B, itraconazole and mycophenolate, no interactions have been seen
 Inducers of drug clearance (e.g. carbamazepine, phenytoin, rifampin, dexamethasone): consider 70 mg intravenous as maintenance dose instead of 50 mg

Duration of treatment
The mean duration of therapy in previous studies was 34 days. Some patients were even healed by a one-day treatment. However, a few patients were treated for as long as 162 days and tolerated the drug well, indicating that longtime use may be indicated and tolerated favourably in complicated cases of aspergillosis. Generally, the duration of treatment is dictated by the severity of the disease, the clinical response, and the improvement of immunocompetence in immunocompromised patients.

Dosage
An initial dose of 70 mg by intravenous infusion is given followed by 50 mg intravenous daily. If no response is seen or if inducers of caspofungin clearance (see above) are coadministered the daily dose may be increased to 70 mg. An infusion should take approximately 1 hour.

Dosage forms
 Cancidas 50 mg for intravenous infusion (manufacturer Merck)
 Cancidas 70 mg for intravenous infusion (manufacturer Merck)
 Brand names in countries other than the U.S. may vary.

Semisynthesis
Caspofungin is semisynthesized from pneumocandin B0, a fermentation product of Glarea lozoyensis.

References

External links 
 
 U.S. Full Prescribing Information
 EMA on Cancidas (Summary of Product Characteristics)

Antifungals
Echinocandins
Merck & Co. brands
World Health Organization essential medicines